Lectionary 9, designated by sigla ℓ 9 (in the Gregory-Aland numbering). It is a Greek manuscript of the New Testament, on vellum leaves. Palaeographically it has been assigned to the 13th-century.

Description 

The codex is a lectionary, it contains lessons from the Gospels: John, Matthew, Luke (Evangelistarium). It is written in Greek minuscule letters, on 260 parchment leaves, 2 columns per page, 24 lines per page. It contains music notes.

History 
The manuscript once belonged to Colbert, as lectionaries ℓ 7, ℓ 8, ℓ 10, ℓ 11, ℓ 12. It was examined and described by Wettstein, Scholz, and Paulin Martin. It was added to the list of the New Testament manuscripts by Wettstein.
C. R. Gregory saw the manuscript in 1885.

The manuscript is not cited in the critical editions of the Greek New Testament of UBS (UBS3).

The codex now is located in the Bibliothèque Nationale de France (Gr. 307) at Paris.

See also 

 List of New Testament lectionaries
 Biblical manuscript
 Textual criticism

References

Bibliography 
 

Greek New Testament lectionaries
13th-century biblical manuscripts
Bibliothèque nationale de France collections